Shelling (or conching) is a rare, innovative tool-based foraging strategy observed in bottlenose dolphins (Tursiops sp.). This behavior includes dolphins driving prey into an empty conch shell, and then pouring the shells contents into its mouth.

History 
The behavior have been observed in bottlenose dolphin by Simon Allen, of the University of Bristol in England, and Michael Krützen, of the University of Zurich who have surveyed Shark Bay since 2007, collecting both genetic and behavioral data for more than 1,000 dolphins; 19 of which have been observed to use the shelling strategy a total of 42 times. The shelling strategy is rarely observed and may be a new and innovative foraging strategy developed by bottlenose dolphins.

Transmission of Behavior 
Research has shown that the shelling behavior spreads not only via a vertical social transmission mechanism, but a non-vertical mechanism as well. Non-vertical social transmission refers to that fact that the behavior can be learned from associates (peer to peer), compared to vertical transmission where learning happens through the mother-calf bond. Dolphins have been shown to primarily use vertical transmission as a learning mechanism, and non-vertical transmission is rarely seen.

Implications of the Discovery

Tool-Usage in Aquatic Life 
  Tool-use in regards to animal behavior can be defined as:the conditional external employment of an unattached or manipulable attached environmental object to alter more efficiently the form, position, or condition of another object, another organism, or the user itself, when the user holds and directly manipulates the tool during or prior to use and is responsible for the proper and effective orientation of the tool.Tool-use behavior has most commonly been assessed in land-based animals, and is rarely seen in aquatic life. This is not necessarily due to a lack of ability, but rather a lack of need. For example, even though dolphins have larger brains compared to primates and could thus be expected to engage in more tool-use foraging behavior, they have other methods like echolocation for attaining resources. With that being said, conching is just one example of tool-use behavior found in dolphins.

Inter-species Cultural Similarities 
Dolphins are not the only animals who show this cultural, non-vertical transmission mechanism. It can be seen in members of the Hominidae family, also known as the great apes, which suggests similarities in culture. Research has suggested that these cultural similarities may stem from the comparable life history characteristics, cognitive abilities, and social systems between the great apes and dolphins. Specifically, both great apes and dolphins live in highly social communities, which enables considerable levels of social interaction.  These high levels of social interaction have been shown to be important in the transmission of socially learned foraging behavior.

See also 
 Cultural hitchhiking#In dolphins (sponging)

References 

Dolphins
Mammal behavior
Carnivory